Washington Historic District is a national historic district located at Washington, Beaufort County, North Carolina. It encompasses 512 contributing buildings and one contributing structure in the town of Washington. They include a variety of institutional, commercial, and residential buildings primarily dating from the late 19th and early 20th centuries.  Notable buildings include the Beaufort County Courthouse, Havens and Fowle warehouses, Mayo Law Office (c. 1830), Marsh House, Myers House, Hyatt House, Griffin House, Rodman House, Elmwood, Firehouse and City Hall (c. 1884), Post Office and Federal Courthouse (1913), railroad station, Presbyterian church, Saint Peter's Episcopal Church, First Methodist Church (1899), Singleton Primitive Baptist Church (c. 1880), Blount-Bragaw Building (1901-1904), Minor House, and George T. Leach House (c. 1890).

It was listed on the National Register of Historic Places in 1978.

References

Historic districts on the National Register of Historic Places in North Carolina
Buildings and structures in Beaufort County, North Carolina
National Register of Historic Places in Beaufort County, North Carolina